The name Lyman has several origins including as an English topographical name, a Dutch name derived from a Germanic personal name, and an American name derived from the German Leimann or Leinemann. Notable people with the name include:

Given name
Lyman Abbott (1835–1922), American theologian and author
Lyman E. Barnes (1855–1904), American politician
Lyman Frank Baum (1856–1919), American author of The Wonderful Wizard of Oz and its sequels
Lyman Beecher (1775–1863), Presbyterian clergyman and leader of the temperance movement
Lyman Bostock (1950–1978), American baseball player
Lyman Bostock Sr. (1918–2005), American baseball player
Lyman Drake (1852–1932), American baseball player
Lyman Duff (1865–1955), eighth Chief Justice of Canada
Lyman W. Emmons (1885–1955), American businessman and politician
Lyman J. Gage (1836–1927), American financier and Presidential Cabinet officer
Lyman Gilmore (1874–1951), aviation pioneer
Lyman Hall (1724–1790), signer of the Declaration of Independence
Lyman H. Howe (1856–1923), American film entrepreneur
Lyman Lamb (1895–1955), American baseball player
Lyman Lemnitzer (1899–1988), U.S. Army general
Lyman Linde (1920–1995), American baseball player
Lyman Smith (American football) (born 1956), American football player
Lyman Bradford Smith (1904–1997), American botanist
Lyman Cornelius Smith (1850–1910), American industrialist
Lyman Spitzer (1914–1997), American theoretical physicist
Lyman Tremain (1819–1878), New York politician
Lyman Truman (1806–1881), New York state senator
Lyman Trumbull (1813–1896), United States senator from Illinois during the American Civil War and impeachment of Andrew Johnson
Lyman Walker (1799–1886), American politician
Lyman Ward (actor) (born 1941), Canadian actor
Lyman White (born 1959), American football player
Lyman Wight (1796–1858), early leader in the Latter Day Saint movement
Lyman Young (1893–1984), American cartoonist

Middle name
 John Lyman Smith (1828–1898), American politician

 Ray Lyman Wilbur (1875–1949), American medical doctor, third president of Stanford University, 31st United States Secretary of the Interior

Surname
 Abe Lyman (1897–1957), popular bandleader from the 1920s to the 1940s
 Amasa Lyman (1813–1877), early leader in the Latter Day Saint movement
 Arthur Lyman (1932–2002), popularizer of a jazzy style of Hawaiian music
 Bernard Lyman, the co-founder of Lyman Brothers Boat Builders and Lyman Boat Works
 Cam Lyman (1932–?between 1987 and 1995), transgender man, multi-millionaire, and breeder of champion spaniels
 Chester Smith Lyman (1814–1890), American teacher, clergyman and astronomer
 David Belden Lyman (1803–1884), missionary and founder of Hilo, Hawaii boarding school
 Dorothy Lyman (born 1947), actress, director and producer
 Edwin Lyman, of the Union of Concerned Scientists
 Eric Lyman (born 1965), U.S. journalist and writer
 Esther Lyman (1927–1991), All-American Girls Professional Baseball League player
 Ethel Louise Lyman (1893 - 1974), American music librarian
 Francis M. Lyman (1840–1916), member of the Quorum of the Twelve Apostles of The Church of Jesus Christ of Latter-day Saints (LDS Church)
 Hannah Lyman (1816-1871), American educator, biographer
 Jeff Lyman (born 1950), American football player
 Joe Lyman (¿–?), rugby league footballer of the 1910s, 1920s and 1930s
 John Lyman (athlete) (1912–1989), American athlete
 Joseph Lyman (1840–1890), Civil War soldier, lawyer, and judge; in the 1880s, he was a two-term Republican congressman
 John Goodwin Lyman (1886–1967), American-Canadian painter
 Mel Lyman (1938–1978), American musician and preacher
 Monty Lyman (born October 1992), British medical doctor and author
 Paul Lyman (born 1965), English rugby league footballer of the 1980s and 1990s
 Peter Lyman (1940–2007), American professor of information science
 Princeton Lyman (1935–2018), American diplomat
 Richard R. Lyman (1870–1963), apostle in The Church of Jesus Christ of Latter-day Saints (LDS Church) from 1918 to 1943
 Richard Wall Lyman (1923–2012), American educator and historian, seventh president of Stanford University
 Rufus Anderson Lyman (1842–1910), Judge and planter from Hawaii 
 Samuel Lyman (1749–1802), Congressman from Massachusetts in 1795–1797
 Shelby Lyman (1936–2019), American chess player
 Stanford Lyman (1933–2003), American sociologist
 Theodore Lyman (1874–1954), physicist and discoverer of the Lyman series
 Theodore Lyman (Massachusetts) (1833–1897), George Gordon Meade's staff officer (1863–1865), Congressman from Massachusetts in 1883–1885
 Will Lyman (born 1948), American actor
 William Whittingham Lyman Jr. (1885–1983), also known as Jack Lyman, American writer and academic, primarily in the field of Celtic studies
 William Lyman (congressman) (1755–1811), Congressman from Massachusetts in 1793–1797
 William R. Lyman ("Link" Lyman, 1898–1972), professional American football player in the 1920s and 1930s

Characters
 Lyman, an early Garfield comic character
 James Lyman, a character from Battlestar Galactica: The Resistance
 Josh Lyman, a character on The West Wing TV program
 Lyman, a character from Animal Crossing
 Lyman Slime, a character from Marvin the Tap-Dancing Horse

See also
 Lyman (disambiguation)
 John Lyman (disambiguation)
 Justice Lyman (disambiguation)
 Lyman Johnson (disambiguation)
 Richard Lyman (disambiguation)
 Lynam, a surname

References